Carol Hay is a Canadian philosopher and Associate Professor of Philosophy at the University of Massachusetts Lowell. She is known for her works on feminist theory and moral philosophy.

Career
Hay's most recent book, Think Like a Feminist: The Philosophy Behind the Revolution (W.W. Norton & Co., 2020), has been called "a crisp, well-informed primer on feminist theory" by Publishers Weekly and "a winning mix of scholarship and irreverence" by Kirkus Reviews. Her academic work focuses primarily on issues in analytic feminism, liberal social and political philosophy, oppression studies, Kantian ethics, and the philosophy of sex and love. Her 2013 book Kantianism, Liberalism, & Feminism: Resisting Oppression received the American Philosophical Association's Gregory Kavka/UCI Prize in Political Philosophy in 2015. Her 2019 op-ed "Who Counts as a Woman?" received the American Philosophical Association's Public Philosophy Op-Ed Prize. Hay's public philosophy has appeared in venues such as The New York Times, The Boston Globe, Aeon, and IAI News.

Works
 (2020). Think Like a Feminist: The Philosophy Behind the Revolution. W.W. Norton
 (2018). Gross Violations. Rowman & Littlefield
 (2018). Resisting Oppression Revisited. Bloomsbury
 (2017). Macmillan Interdisciplinary Handbooks: Feminist Philosophy. Macmillan Reference USA, a part of Gale, Cengage Learning
 (2016). Philosophy of Feminism. Macmillan Reference USA, a part of Gale, Cengage Learning
  (2013). Kantianism, Liberalism, and Feminism: Resisting Oppression. Palgrave Macmillan

References

External links
Carol Hay

21st-century Canadian philosophers
Philosophy academics
Living people
Canadian women philosophers
Political philosophers
Year of birth missing (living people)
Feminist theorists
University of Massachusetts Lowell faculty
Ohio State University alumni